Zhou Keyu (Chinese: 周柯宇; born May 17, 2002), also known by his English name Daniel Zhou, is an American born Chinese singer, dancer and actor. He is a member of the Chinese boy group Into1, after placing 10th in the final episode of Produce Camp 2021.  He is also a member of the Chinese boy group BEST. He made his solo debut with the single R.O.T.Y on March 1, 2021.

Early life
Zhou was born in United States on May 17, 2002. He grew up in Beijing, China. He has two older brothers, and he grew up under his brother's care due to having no contact with his father.

Career

2018-2020: Career Beginnings, and Debut with Best
On December 14, 2018, Jaywalk Studio announced 14 new trainees under their company, Zhou Keyu being one of them. On December 10, 2019, Zhou debuted in the Chinese boy group BEST and released their single with the same name.

On July 23, 2020, Zhou as well as 32 others were introduced as guests on the Chinese talent variety show Happy Camp

2021-present: Debut with Into1 and solo endeavors
On February 18, 2021, he participated in the Chinese survival show program Produce Camp 2021. He consistently ranked within the Top 11 throughout the show, and on the final episode he placed 10th making him a member of the multi-national boy group Into1.

On February 22, 2021, Zhou made his acting debut in the Chinese drama series Remember My Boy acting as the lead role.

On March 1, 2021 he made his solo debut with the single "R.O.T.Y".

Ambassadorships and Endorsements
Alongside his activities with Into1, Zhou Keyu has been appointed as the brand ambassador and spokesperson for various brands. As well as this, he has appeared as a model in magazines such as LEON, GRAZIA and more.

Discography

Singles

Soundtrack Appearances

Other Songs

Production credits

Filmography

Film

Television series

Television shows

Hosting

Notes

External Links
 
 Zhou Keyu on QQ Music

References

2002 births
Living people
Produce 101 (Chinese TV series) contestants
Reality show winners
American people of Chinese descent
Into1 members
21st-century Chinese male singers
Chinese idols
Mandopop singers
Chinese male television actors
English-language singers from China
Chinese male dancers
Chinese male singers